The following is a partial list of the "C" codes for Medical Subject Headings (MeSH), as defined by the United States National Library of Medicine (NLM).

This list continues the information at List of MeSH codes (C22). Codes following these are found at List of MeSH codes (D01). For other MeSH codes, see List of MeSH codes.

The source for this content is the set of 2006 MeSH Trees from the NLM.

– pathological conditions, signs and symptoms

– pathological conditions, anatomical

– alopecia

– atrophy
  – muscular atrophy

– blister

– calculi
  – dental calculus
  – gallstones
  – salivary calculi
  – salivary duct calculi
  – salivary gland calculi
  – urinary calculi
  – bladder calculi
  – kidney calculi
  – ureteral calculi

– choristoma

– constriction, pathologic

– cysts
  – parovarian cyst

– dilatation, pathologic

– diverticulum
  – diverticulum, colon
  – diverticulum, esophageal
  – zenker diverticulum
  – diverticulum, stomach
  – meckel diverticulum

– facial asymmetry

– fistula
  – cutaneous fistula
  – digestive system fistula
  – biliary fistula
  – esophageal fistula
  – tracheoesophageal fistula
  – gastric fistula
  – intestinal fistula
  – rectal fistula
  – rectovaginal fistula
  – pancreatic fistula
  – oral fistula
  – dental fistula
  – oroantral fistula
  – salivary gland fistula
  – respiratory tract fistula
  – bronchial fistula
  – urinary fistula
  – bladder fistula
  – vesicovaginal fistula
  – vaginal fistula
  – rectovaginal fistula
  – vesicovaginal fistula
  – vascular fistula
  – arterio-arterial fistula
  – arteriovenous fistula

– hernia
  – hernia, abdominal
  – gastroschisis
  – hernia, femoral
  – hernia, inguinal
  – hernia, ventral
  – hernia, umbilical
  – hernia, diaphragmatic
  – hernia, diaphragmatic, traumatic
  – hernia, hiatal
  – hernia, obturator

– hypertrophy
  – cardiomegaly
  – hepatomegaly
  – splenomegaly

– leg length inequality

– polyps
  – intestinal polyps
  – colonic polyps
  – nasal polyps

– prolapse

– rupture, spontaneous

– torsion
  – intestinal volvulus

– pathologic processes

– acantholysis

– adhesions

– arrhythmia
  – arrhythmia, sinus
  – atrial fibrillation
  – atrial flutter
  – bradycardia
  – cardiac complexes, premature
  – atrial premature complexes
  – ventricular premature complexes
  – heart block
  – adams-stokes syndrome
  – bundle-branch block
  – sinoatrial block
  – parasystole
  – tachycardia
  – tachycardia, paroxysmal
  – tachycardia, supraventricular
  – accelerated idioventricular rhythm
  – tachycardia, atrioventricular nodal reentry
  – tachycardia, ectopic atrial
  – tachycardia, ectopic junctional
  – tachycardia, sinoatrial nodal reentry
  – tachycardia, sinus
  – tachycardia, ventricular
  – torsades de pointes
  – ventricular fibrillation

– ascites

– chromosome aberrations
  – aneuploidy
  – monosomy
  – trisomy
  – chromosome instability
  – chromosome fragility
  – chromosome breakage
  – chromosome deletion
  – inversion, chromosome
  – isochromosomes
  – micronuclei, chromosome-defective
  – nondisjunction, genetic
  – uniparental disomy
  – ring chromosomes
  – sex chromosome aberrations
  – xyy karyotype
  – translocation, genetic
  – philadelphia chromosome

– death
  – asphyxia
  – brain death
  – cadaver
  – postmortem changes
  – autolysis
  – rigor mortis
  – death, sudden
  – death, sudden, cardiac
  – sudden infant death
  – drowning
  – embryo loss
  – fetal death
  – fetal resorption

– dehydration

– delayed graft function

– disease
  – syndrome

– disease attributes
  – acute disease
  – catastrophic illness
  – chronic disease
  – convalescence
  – critical illness
  – disease progression
  – disease susceptibility
  – genetic predisposition to disease
  – anticipation, genetic
  – diseases in twins
  – emergencies
  – facies
  – iatrogenic disease
  – rare diseases
  – recurrence

– diverticulitis

– emphysema
  – mediastinal emphysema
  – subcutaneous emphysema

– extravasation of diagnostic and therapeutic materials

– fibrosis
  – retroperitoneal fibrosis

– genomic instability
  – chromosomal instability
  – chromosome fragility

– gliosis

– granuloma
  – eosinophilic granuloma
  – granuloma annulare
  – granuloma, foreign-body
  – granuloma, giant cell
  – granuloma, lethal midline
  – granuloma, plasma cell
  – granuloma, plasma cell, orbital
  – granuloma, plasma cell, pulmonary
  – granuloma, pyogenic
  – granuloma, respiratory tract
  – granuloma, laryngeal

– granulomatosis, orofacial

– growth disorders
  – failure to thrive
  – fetal growth retardation

– hemolysis

– hemorrhage
  – blood loss, surgical
  – ecchymosis
  – epistaxis
  – eye hemorrhage
  – choroid hemorrhage
  – hyphema
  – retinal hemorrhage
  – vitreous hemorrhage
  – gastrointestinal hemorrhage
  – hematemesis
  – melena
  – peptic ulcer hemorrhage
  – hemarthrosis
  – hematocele
  – hematoma
  – hematoma, epidural, cranial
  – hematoma, epidural, spinal
  – hematoma, subdural
  – hematoma, subdural, acute
  – hematoma, subdural, chronic
  – hematoma, subdural, intracranial
  – hematoma, subdural, spinal
  – hematuria
  – hemobilia
  – hemoperitoneum
  – hemoptysis
  – hemothorax
  – hemopneumothorax
  – intracranial hemorrhages
  – cerebral hemorrhage
  – basal ganglia hemorrhage
  – putaminal hemorrhage
  – hematoma, epidural, cranial
  – hematoma, subdural
  – hematoma, subdural, acute
  – hematoma, subdural, chronic
  – hematoma, subdural, intracranial
  – subarachnoid hemorrhage
  – oral hemorrhage
  – gingival hemorrhage
  – postoperative hemorrhage
  – retrobulbar hemorrhage
  – shock, hemorrhagic
  – uterine hemorrhage
  – metrorrhagia
  – postpartum hemorrhage

– hyperbilirubinemia
  – hyperbilirubinemia, neonatal
  – jaundice, neonatal
  – jaundice
  – jaundice, obstructive
  – kernicterus

– hyperplasia

– hypovolemia

– inflammation
  – acute-phase reaction
  – foreign-body reaction
  – neurogenic inflammation
  – seroma
  – serositis
  – suppuration
  – abscess
  – cellulitis
  – empyema

– intraoperative complications
  – blood loss, surgical

– leukoaraiosis

– leukocytosis

– lithiasis

– malacoplakia

– menstruation disturbances
  – amenorrhea
  – dysmenorrhea
  – menorrhagia
  – oligomenorrhea
  – premenstrual syndrome

– metaplasia
  – neovascularization, pathologic
  – choroidal neovascularization
  – retinal neovascularization

– multiple organ failure
  – shock
  – sepsis syndrome
  – shock, cardiogenic
  – shock, hemorrhagic
  – shock, septic
  – shock, surgical
  – shock, traumatic

– muscle weakness

– necrosis
  – dental pulp necrosis
  – fat necrosis
  – gangrene
  – infarction
  – osteonecrosis
  – femur head necrosis

– neoplastic processes
  – anaplasia
  – cell transformation, neoplastic
  – blast crisis
  – cell transformation, viral
  – cocarcinogenesis
  – neoplasm invasiveness
  – leukemic infiltration
  – neoplasm metastasis
  – lymphatic metastasis
  – neoplasm circulating cells
  – neoplasm seeding
  – neoplasms, unknown primary
  – neoplasm recurrence, local
  – neoplasm regression, spontaneous
  – neoplasm, residual

– nerve degeneration
  – retrograde degeneration
  – wallerian degeneration

– ossification, heterotopic
  – ossification of posterior longitudinal ligament

– postoperative complications
  – afferent loop syndrome
  – graft occlusion, vascular
  – malignant hyperthermia
  – pain, postoperative
  – postcholecystectomy syndrome
  – postgastrectomy syndromes
  – dumping syndrome
  – postoperative hemorrhage
  – postoperative nausea and vomiting
  – postpericardiotomy syndrome
  – prosthesis failure
  – prosthesis-related infections
  – reperfusion injury
  – myocardial reperfusion injury
  – shock, surgical
  – short bowel syndrome
  – surgical wound dehiscence
  – surgical wound infection

– retropneumoperitoneum

– sclerosis

– stress

– ulcer

– yang deficiency

– yin deficiency

– signs and symptoms

– aging, premature

– asthenia

– body temperature changes
  – fever
  – fever of unknown origin
  – sweating sickness
  – hypothermia

– body weight
  – birth weight
  – fetal macrosomia
  – body weight changes
  – weight gain
  – weight loss
  – emaciation
  – cachexia
  – fetal weight
  – overweight
  – obesity
  – obesity, morbid
  – thinness

– chills

– cyanosis

– edema
  – hydrops fetalis

– eye manifestations
  – eye hemorrhage

– fatigue

– feminization

– fetal distress

– flushing

– heart murmurs

– hot flashes

– mobility limitation

– neurologic manifestations
  – bladder, neurogenic
  – cerebrospinal fluid otorrhea
  – cerebrospinal fluid rhinorrhea
  – decerebrate state
  – dyskinesias
  – ataxia
  – cerebellar ataxia
  – gait ataxia
  – athetosis
  – catalepsy
  – chorea
  – dystonia
  – torticollis
  – hyperkinesis
  – hypokinesia
  – myoclonus
  – psychomotor agitation
  – akathisia, drug-induced
  – synkinesis
  – tics
  – tremor
  – gait disorders, neurologic
  – gait apraxia
  – gait ataxia
  – meningism
  – neurobehavioral manifestations
  – apraxias
  – catatonia
  – communication disorders
  – language disorders
  – agraphia
  – anomic aphasia
  – dyslexia
  – Alexia (acquired dyslexia)
  – alexia, pure
  – language development disorders
  – speech disorders
  – aphasia
  – expressive aphasia
  – aphasia, conduction
  – primary progressive aphasia
  – receptive aphasia
  – articulation disorders
  – dysarthria
  – echolalia
  – mutism
  – stuttering
  – learning disorders
  – dyslexia
  – Alexia (acquired dyslexia)
  – confusion
  – delirium
  – consciousness disorders
  – unconsciousness
  – coma
  – persistent vegetative state
  – syncope
  – syncope, vasovagal
  – memory disorders
  – amnesia
  – amnesia, anterograde
  – amnesia, retrograde
  – amnesia, transient global
  – korsakoff syndrome
  – mental retardation
  – perceptual disorders
  – agnosia
  – gerstmann syndrome
  – prosopagnosia
  – auditory perceptual disorders
  – hallucinations
  – illusions
  – phantom limb
  – psychomotor disorders
  – apraxias
  – apraxia, ideomotor
  – gait apraxia
  – psychomotor agitation
  – neuromuscular manifestations
  – fasciculation
  – muscle cramp
  – muscle hypertonia
  – muscle rigidity
  – muscle spasticity
  – muscle hypotonia
  – muscle weakness
  – muscular atrophy
  – myokymia
  – myotonia
  – spasm
  – hemifacial spasm
  – trismus
  – tetany
  – pain
  – back pain
  – low back pain
  – facial pain
  – headache
  – labor pain
  – metatarsalgia
  – neck pain
  – neuralgia
  – neuralgia, postherpetic
  – sciatica
  – pain, intractable
  – paralysis
  – facial paralysis
  – gastroparesis
  – hemiplegia
  – ophthalmoplegia
  – ophthalmoplegia, chronic progressive external
  – supranuclear palsy, progressive
  – paraplegia
  – brown-sequard syndrome
  – pseudobulbar palsy
  – quadriplegia
  – respiratory paralysis
  – vocal cord paralysis
  – paresis
  – paraparesis
  – paraparesis, spastic
  – psychophysiologic disorders
  – pupil disorders
  – anisocoria
  – miosis
  – horner syndrome
  – tonic pupil
  – reflex, abnormal
  – reflex, babinski
  – seizures
  – sensation disorders
  – dizziness
  – hearing disorders
  – hearing loss
  – deafness
  – hearing loss, bilateral
  – hearing loss, conductive
  – hearing loss, functional
  – hearing loss, high-frequency
  – hearing loss, mixed conductive-sensorineural
  – hearing loss, sensorineural
  – hearing loss, central
  – hearing loss, noise-induced
  – presbycusis
  – usher syndromes
  – hearing loss, sudden
  – hearing loss, unilateral
  – hyperacusis
  – tinnitus
  – olfaction disorders
  – somatosensory disorders
  – hyperalgesia
  – hyperesthesia
  – hypesthesia
  – paresthesia
  – taste disorders
  – ageusia
  – dysgeusia
  – vision disorders
  – amblyopia
  – blindness
  – amaurosis fugax
  – blindness, cortical
  – color vision defects
  – diplopia
  – hemianopsia
  – photophobia
  – scotoma
  – vision, low
  – sleep disorders
  – sleep deprivation
  – vertigo
  – voice disorders
  – aphonia
  – hoarseness

– oral manifestations
  – oral hemorrhage

– pain
  – abdominal pain
  – abdomen, acute
  – colic
  – arthralgia
  – shoulder pain
  – back pain
  – low back pain
  – chest pain
  – angina pectoris
  – angina, unstable
  – angina pectoris, variant
  – earache
  – facial pain
  – toothache
  – flank pain
  – glossalgia
  – headache
  – labor pain
  – metatarsalgia
  – neck pain
  – neuralgia
  – neuralgia, postherpetic
  – sciatica
  – pain, intractable
  – pain, postoperative
  – pelvic pain
  – dysmenorrhea
  – shoulder pain

– pseudophakia

– reticulocytosis

– signs and symptoms, digestive
  – abdominal pain
  – abdomen, acute
  – colic
  – aerophagy
  – anorexia
  – constipation
  – coprophagia
  – diarrhea
  – diarrhea, infantile
  – dyspepsia
  – encopresis
  – eructation
  – flatulence
  – gagging
  – halitosis
  – heartburn
  – hiccup
  – hyperphagia
  – bulimia
  – nausea
  – postoperative nausea and vomiting
  – vomiting
  – hematemesis
  – morning sickness
  – hyperemesis gravidarum
  – postoperative nausea and vomiting
  – vomiting, anticipatory

– signs and symptoms, respiratory
  – anoxia
  – altitude sickness
  – anoxemia
  – apnea
  – cheyne-stokes respiration
  – cough
  – dyspnea
  – dyspnea, paroxysmal
  – hemoptysis
  – hoarseness
  – hypercapnia
  – hyperoxia
  – hyperventilation
  – hypocapnia
  – hypoventilation
  – mouth breathing
  – respiratory sounds
  – snoring
  – sneezing

– skin manifestations
  – cafe-au-lait spots
  – ecchymosis
  – jaundice
  – jaundice, obstructive
  – pallor
  – pruritus
  – tinea pedis
  – purpura

– urological manifestations
  – anuria
  – oliguria
  – polyuria

– virilism
  – hirsutism

The list continues at List of MeSH codes (D01).

C23